Midvale, WA may mean:

Midvale, Washington, a community in the United States
Midvale, Western Australia, a suburb of Perth in Australia